Paavo Armas Karjalainen (5 December 1904, in Valkeala – 1 November 1978) was a Finnish journalist and politician. He was a member of the Parliament of Finland from 1945 to 1951, representing the Social Democratic Party of Finland (SDP).

References

1904 births
1978 deaths
People from Valkeala
People from Viipuri Province (Grand Duchy of Finland)
Social Democratic Party of Finland politicians
Members of the Parliament of Finland (1945–48)
Members of the Parliament of Finland (1948–51)
Finnish people of World War II